The women's singles was one of five events of the 1921 World Hard Court Championships tennis tournament held in Paris, France from 28 May until 5 June 1921. The draw consisted of 22 players. Dorothy Holman was the title holder, but she lost in the second round to Jeanne Vaussard. Suzanne Lenglen defeated Molla Mallory in the final for her second World Hard Court Championship title. Lenglen had won the tournament in 1914 and would win the next two editions in 1922 and 1923 as well.

Draw

Finals

Top half

Bottom half

References

Women's Singles
World Hard Court Championships